Richard Giragosian is an Armenian American academic who serves as both a contributing analyst for Al Jazeera and the Asia Times. Giragosian has served as a consultant for the Asian Development Bank, the European Union Delegation to Armenia, the French Ministry of Defence, the Organization for Security and Cooperation in Europe and the United States Department of State. In addition, he has written for the European Council on Foreign Relations, Le Monde, the Moscow Times, and the Turkish Policy Quarterly.

Career 
He was born on January 8, 1965, in Providence, Rhode Island. From 2002-2006, Giragosian served as a guest lecturer for the United States Army Special Forces at the John F. Kennedy Special Warfare Center and School at Fort Bragg. For nine years, Giragosian served as a professional staff member of the Joint Economic Committee (JEC) of the U.S. Congress and was the committee’s principal staffer for the former Soviet Union and China, responsible for organizing congressional hearings and conducting analytical studies for members of congress, and served as committee liaison to the Central Intelligence Agency and the Defense Intelligence Agency.

References

Year of birth missing (living people)
Living people
Armenian political scientists
American emigrants to Armenia